Commander Alexander "Alastair" Guthrie Denniston  (1 December 1881 – 1 January 1961) was a Scottish codebreaker in Room 40, deputy head of the Government Code and Cypher School (GC&CS) and hockey player. Denniston was appointed operational head of GC&CS in 1919 and remained so until February 1942.

Early life

Denniston was born in Greenock, Renfrewshire, the son of a medical practitioner. He studied at the University of Bonn and the University of Paris. Denniston was a member of the Scottish Olympic hockey team in 1908 and won a bronze medal. He played as a half-back, and his club team was listed as Edinburgh. In the IOC's official 1908 report, he is listed as Dennistoun rather than Denniston.

First World War and interbellum
In 1914 Denniston helped form Room 40 in the Admiralty, an organisation responsible for intercepting and decrypting enemy messages. In 1917 he married a fellow Room 40 worker, Dorothy Mary Gilliat.

After First World War, Denniston, recognising the strategic importance of codebreaking, kept the Room 40 activity functioning.  Room 40 was merged with its counterpart in the Army, MI1b in 1919, renamed the Government Code and Cypher School (GC&CS) in 1920 and transferred from the Navy to the Foreign Office. Denniston was chosen to run the new organisation.

With the rise of Hitler, Denniston began making preparations. Following the practice of his superiors at Room 40, he contacted scientists from Oxford and Cambridge (including Alan Turing and Gordon Welchman) asking if they would be willing to serve if war broke out. Sinclair acquired the Bletchley Park property and Denniston was assigned to prepare the site and design the huts to be built on the grounds. The GC&CS moved to the new location in August 1939, just before the Invasion of Poland and the start of the Second World War. Its name changed to Government Communications Headquarters (GCHQ).

On 26 July 1939, five weeks before the outbreak of war, Denniston was one of three Britons (along with Dilly Knox and Humphrey Sandwith) who participated in the trilateral Polish-French-British conference held in the Kabaty Woods south of Warsaw, at which the Polish Biuro Szyfrów (Cipher Bureau) initiated the French and British into the decryption of German military Enigma ciphers.

Second World War
Denniston remained in command until he was hospitalised in June 1940 for a bladder stone. Despite his illness, he flew to the United States in 1941 to make contact with American cryptographers including William Friedman. Denniston returned to Bletchley Park for a while but moved to London later in 1941 to work on diplomatic traffic.

Despite his knowledge of the success of Polish cryptologists against Enigma, Denniston shared the general pessimism about the prospects of breaking the more complex Naval Enigma encryption until as late as the summer of 1940, having told the Head of Naval Section at Bletchley: "You know, the Germans don't mean you to read their stuff, and I don't expect you ever will." The advent of Banburismus shortly afterwards showed his pessimism to be misplaced. 

In October 1941, the originator of the technique, Alan Turing, along with fellow senior cryptologists Gordon Welchman, Stuart Milner-Barry and Hugh Alexander wrote to Churchill, over the head of Denniston, to alert Churchill to the fact that a shortage of staff at Bletchley Park was preventing them from deciphering many messages. An addition of personnel, small by military standards, could make a big difference to the effectiveness of the fighting effort. The slow response to previous requests had convinced them that the strategic value of their work was not understood in the right quarters. In the letter, there was praise for the 'energy and foresight' of Commander Edward Travis.

Churchill reacted to the letter immediately, ordering "Action this day". Resources were transferred as fast as possible.

In February 1942, GC&CS was reorganised. Travis, Denniston's second in command and chief of the Naval section, succeeded Denniston at Bletchley Park, overseeing the work on military codes and ciphers.
When Travis took over, he "presided over an administrative revolution which at last brought the management of Intelligence into line with its mode of production".

Personal and post-war life
Denniston and his wife had two children: a son and daughter. Their son, Robin, was educated at Westminster School and Christ Church, Oxford. After Alastair's demotion and resulting decreased income, Robin's school fees were paid by benefactors. However, the Dennistons' daughter had to leave her school due to lack of funds.

Denniston retired in 1945, and later taught French and Latin in Leatherhead.

William Friedman, the American cryptographer who broke the Japanese Purple code, later wrote to Denniston's daughter "Your father was a great man in whose debt all English-speaking people will remain for a very long time, if not forever. That so few should know exactly what he did ... is the sad part."

Robin distinguished himself as a publisher. In 2007, he published Thirty Secret Years, a biography of his father that consolidated his reputation in GCHQ history.

Honours and awards
7 January 1918 appointed an Officer of the Order of the British Empire (OBE) Commander Alexander Guthrie Denniston, R.N.V.R. Naval Intelligence Division, Admiralty.
2 January 1933 appointed a Commander of the Order of the British Empire (CBE) Commander Alexander Guthrie Denniston, O.B.E., R.N.V.R. Head of a Department, Foreign Office.
12 June 1941 appointed a Companion of the Order of St Michael and St George (CMG) Commander Alexander Guthrie Denniston, C.B.E., R.N.V.R. (Retd.), Head of a Department of the Foreign Office.

Fictional depictions

In the 2014 film The Imitation Game, he is portrayed by Charles Dance.

References

Bibliography
 Robin Denniston Churchill's Secret War: Diplomatic Decrypts, the Foreign Office and Turkey 1942–44 (1997)
 James Gannon, Stealing Secrets, Telling Lies: How Spies and Codebreakers Helped Shape the Twentieth Century, Washington, D.C., Brassey's, 2001, .
 F. H. Hinsley and Alan Stripp, eds., Codebreakers: the Inside Story of Bletchley Park, Oxford University Press, 1993, .
 Władysław Kozaczuk, Enigma:  How the German Machine Cipher Was Broken and How It Was Read by the Allies in World War II, edited and translated by Christopher Kasparek, Frederick, MD, University Publications of America, 1984, pp. 59–60.

External links
 The Papers of Alexander Guthrie Denniston are held at the Churchill Archives Centre in Cambridge, and are accessible to the public.
DatabaseOlympics.com profile
Thirty Secret Years: A.G. Denniston's work in signals intelligence 1914-1944

 

British cryptographers
Pre-computer cryptographers
Bletchley Park people
1881 births
1961 deaths
British people of World War I
British people of World War II
Royal Navy officers
Commanders of the Order of the British Empire
Companions of the Order of St Michael and St George
GCHQ
Scottish male field hockey players
Olympic bronze medallists for Great Britain
Olympic medalists in field hockey
Olympic field hockey players of Great Britain
British male field hockey players
Field hockey players at the 1908 Summer Olympics
University of Bonn alumni
University of Paris alumni
People from Greenock
Medalists at the 1908 Summer Olympics
Scottish Olympic medallists
Foreign Office personnel of World War II
British expatriates in France